Luis Alberto Zeballos (born 3 March 1985) is an Argentine professional footballer who plays as a midfielder for Colegiales.

Career
Colegiales were Zeballos' first club, with the midfielder remaining with them from 2002 up until 2012 whilst making two hundred and fifty-four appearances and scoring seven goals; across seasons in Primera C Metropolitana and Primera B Metropolitana. On 13 June 2012, Zeballos joined fellow third tier team Los Andes. He made his debut during a draw with Deportivo Morón on 5 August, which was one of thirty-six matches for the club in 2012–13; which he ended with goals versus Tristán Suárez and Atlanta. His third season ended with promotion to Primera B Nacional. He lasted three more years, taking his tally to one hundred and fifty-seven games.

Zeballos spent the 2017–18 Primera B Metropolitana back with Colegiales, prior to subsequently returning to Los Andes in June 2018. He made his second bow for the Lomas de Zamora team on 25 August against Independiente Rivadavia.

Career statistics
.

Honours
Colegiales
 Primera C Metropolitana: 2007–08

References

External links

1985 births
Living people
People from Malvinas Argentinas Partido
Argentine footballers
Association football midfielders
Primera C Metropolitana players
Primera B Metropolitana players
Primera Nacional players
Club Atlético Colegiales (Argentina) players
Club Atlético Los Andes footballers
Sportspeople from Buenos Aires Province